Zingst is a municipality in the Vorpommern-Rügen district, in Mecklenburg-Vorpommern, Germany. It is located on the peninsula of Zingst.

References